Headless may refer to:

Science and technology

Medicine 

 Acephalic acardia, a type of twin reversed arterial perfusion in which one twin is born without a head
 Acrania, missing cranial bones
 Anencephaly, absence of a major part of the brain and skull
 Decapitation, the severing of the whole head from the body

Computing 
In computing and software, headless can either refer to software or servers without a graphical interface, or software platforms that decouple front- and back-end components.
Headless system, a server with no monitor, keyboard, or mouse attached
 Headless software, software capable of working on a device without a graphical user interface
 Headless browser, a web browser without a graphical user interface
Headless CMS, a backend-only content management system that employs APIs to display content

Linguistics 

 Headless phrase, a term in linguistics for a phrase with no head

Geology 

 Headless Formation, a geologic formation in Northwest Territories

Arts and entertainment 

 Headless (TV series) a British television series starring Patrick Robinson and Ginny Holder
 Headless, a foe in Ultima
 Headless, NPCs in The Matrix Online
 Headless (film), a 2015 horror film by Arthur Cullipher
 Headless (band), an Italian hard rock band
 Mike the Headless Chicken (non-fiction), a Wyandotte chicken that lived for 18 months after his head had been cut off
 "Headless", a song by Joe Satriani from his album Flying in a Blue Dream
 "Headless", a song by Hella from the album Tripper

Literature and myths 

 Headless line, a form of catalexis omitting an initial syllable
 Headless men, a mythical headless humanoid creature
 Headless Horseman (disambiguation)

 Headless Horseman